Agonopterix selini is a moth of the family Depressariidae. It is found in most of Europe, except Ireland, Great Britain, the Benelux, Portugal and most of the Balkan Peninsula.

The wingspan is 15–18 mm.

The larvae feed on Selinum and Peucedanum species, including Peucedanum cervaria and Peucedanum oreoselinum.

References

External links
lepiforum.de

Moths described in 1870
Agonopterix
Moths of Europe